Richard F. Strand is a linguist and anthropological researcher who is best known for his research into Nuristani languages and other little-known languages of Afghanistan and neighboring areas of Pakistan.

He was trained at Cornell University. He has published material on the linguistics and ethnography of Nuristan and neighboring regions, collected and analyzed since 1967. Funding for his field research in Nuristan, Afghanistan, and Pakistan was provided in part by the following institutions: the Fulbright Foundation (1991–92), the Smithsonian Institution (1980, 1984–85), The Wenner-Gren Foundation for Anthropological Research (1972), Brown University (1971), Cornell University (1966–69, 1970), and Teachers College, Columbia University (1967–69).

References

External links
Richard Strand's Nuristān Site

Linguists from the United States
Living people
20th-century linguists
21st-century linguists
20th-century American anthropologists
21st-century American anthropologists
Cornell University alumni
Year of birth missing (living people)